Blommersia blommersae is a species of frog in the family Mantellidae. It is endemic to east-central Madagascar. Both the generic and specific names honour Rose Marie Antoinette Blommers-Schlösser, a Dutch herpetologist and entomologist who collected the type series. Common name Moramanga Madagascar frog has been proposed for it.

Description
The overall appearance is slender. The fingers have no webbing whereas the toes are webbed. The colouration is variable: the dorsum is gray or light brown with darker, irregular spots, forming an inter-ocular bar and a V-shaped pattern on the scapular region. The canthal and tympanic regions are brown. The upper lip is white. The lower surfaces are irregularly speckled with dark, especially on the throat and chest.

The male advertisement call is a series of 2–3 chirps lasting about 70–150 ms.

Tadpoles in Gosner stage 25 measure  and in stages 39–41  in total length.

Habitat and conservation
It can occur in degraded habitats when swamps are present, but not in agricultural areas. Males often call from low vegetation. Breeding takes place in swamps; the eggs are laid on leaves above water. It is a locally very abundant species. It is suffering from the loss of forest habitats. It is known from one reserve near the Andasibe-Mantadia National Park and from the Ranomafana National Park.

References

blommersae
Endemic frogs of Madagascar
Amphibians described in 1975
Taxa named by Jean Marius René Guibé
Taxonomy articles created by Polbot